Expo MRT station is a Mass Rapid Transit (MRT) interchange station on the East West line (EWL) and Downtown line (DTL) in the Tampines planning area, Singapore. The station lies between Changi City Point and the Singapore Expo, located along Changi South Avenue 1 at the junction of Expo Drive.

The station is part of the two-station branch line which extends from Tanah Merah to Changi Airport station. Plans to connect the EWL to Changi Airport were finalised in 1996 and construction began in 1999. The station opened on 10 January 2001, a year earlier than Changi Airport station. It later became the terminus for the DTL upon the completion of Stage 3 of that line in 2017. On 25 May 2019, it was announced that the station will be incorporated into the Thomson–East Coast line (TEL), which is planned to extend to the airport's Terminal 5 by 2040.

History

Changi Airport branch

In 1994, there were plans to build a new rail connection to Changi Airport. The alignment of the two-station branch, which included Expo station, was finalised through an announcement by Deputy Prime Minister Lee Hsien Loong on 15 November 1996.

The station opened on 10 January 2001 upon the request of Singapore Expo, a year before the opening of Changi Airport station. As part of the President's Challenge 2001 in September, a part of a charity walk went through the tunnel between Expo and Changi Airport stations. The branch line was later extended to Changi Airport when that station opened on 8 February 2002. As with most of the older above-ground stations along the EWL, the station was built without platform screen doors (PSDs). The half-height PSDs at Expo station began installation on 20 June 2011 and started operations on 31 August.

Downtown line

On 20 August 2010, the Land Transport Authority (LTA) that Stage 3 of the DTL (DTL3) would terminate at Expo station, where the DTL would interchange with the EWL. Contract 922 for the design and construction of Expo station and the overrun tunnels was awarded to Samsung C&T Corporation for S$211.35million (US$ million) in May 2011. On 28 November 2011, the LTA marked the start of construction of DTL3 with a groundbreaking ceremony at Expo station.

To facilitate the construction of the DTL station and its tunnels, part of Changi South Avenue 1 towards Somapah Road and Changi South Avenue 2, together with a short section of Expo Drive, were temporarily closed to traffic from 2 October 2011 to May 2017. The construction of the station also involved the underpinning of two existing Expo MRT viaduct pier foundations. A transfer-beam was constructed before the excavation to support the two pillars and hydraulic jacks were installed on the transfer beam. Subsequently, the existing pilers were cut away. The underpinning works were carried out successfully without disruption to the EWL's operations.

On 31 May 2017, the LTA announced that the station, together with the rest of DTL3, would be opened on 21 October that year. Passengers were offered a preview of the station along with the other DTL 3 stations through an open house on 15 October.

Future plans
The DTL is projected to be extended from Expo station via Xilin to Sungei Bedok MRT station as part of the DTL3 extension (DTL3e). Expected to be completed in 2024, the extension was constructed in tandem with the adjacent East Coast Integrated Depot. The extension is expected to provide better public transport service to Changi Business Park. On 25 May 2019, as part of the Land Transport Masterplan 2040, the LTA announced that the stretch between Tanah Merah and Changi Airport would also be part of the proposed Thomson–East Coast line (TEL) extension to Changi Airport from Sungei Bedok station via the future Changi Airport Terminal 5.

Station details

Location
As the name suggests, the station serves the convention centre of Singapore Expo. The elevated EWL station is located along Changi South Avenue 1 while the DTL station is underneath the junction of the road and Expo Drive. In addition to the Singapore Expo, the station serves the retail development of Changi City Point, as well as various offices in Changi Business Park such as UE Bizhub East, IBM Place and DBS Asia Hub.

Services

The station is an interchange station on the EWL and DTL. On the EWL, the station is between the Tanah Merah and Changi Airport stations on the Changi Airport branch. Train services to Expo station initially operated as a 2-station shuttle service from Tanah Merah station, then briefly converted to a through service from Boon Lay station when the branch extended to Changi Airport station. However, due to ridership falling below expectations, the service was reverted into shuttle mode on 22 July 2003. On the DTL, the station is the current terminus on the line, with the next station being Upper Changi station. The DTL extension to Sungei Bedok is scheduled to open in 2024; the next station in that direction will be Xilin.

Architecture

The elevated EWL station is designed by British architectural firm Foster and Partners. The roof above the concourse reflects sunlight into the station, reducing the need for artificial lighting, while the platform canopy deflects heat from the sun, cooling the platform by up to  compared to its surroundings. The materials of the roofs were adapted to Singapore's climate.

The station's large interior allows natural lighting and ventilation. Expo station is the first on the MRT that did not require paintwork as the interior is mainly stone, glass or metal. The station contains a lift in a transparent shaft, as well as highly illuminated energy-saving escalators, which complement the "futuristic outlook" of the station. The futuristic design is intended to reflect the country's willingness to experiment with new ideas and technology, symbolising the "thriving world-class city" that Singapore was projected to become in the 21st century.

The DTL station design by Greenhilli utilises "interconnectivity, spatial volume, asymmetry, daylight, colour [and] super-graphics" to signify transition and movement. The station is designed to allow commuters to navigate around the station easily while making it identifiable to the locality. The station's entrances and auxiliary buildings are designed in a "sculptural and dynamic" manner, which the designers believed would give the impression of "gateways" into the neighbourhood. The station was praised for its "excellent design" for its "refined" detailing and ingenious usage of colours and textures, while fulfilling the "restrictive" demands around the area. The station design won the Singapore Institute of Architects Design Awards 2020, with the institute's jury citing the station's "elegant resolution of architecture".

Artwork
The artwork "A Banquet" by Yeo Chee Kiong was commissioned at the DTL station as part of the MRT network's Art-in-Transit programme, a showcase that integrates public artwork in the MRT network. The large 3D artwork depicts two reflective isometric chairs and a bulbous speech balloon, which signifies not only the importance of communication during periods of technological advancement and digital media, but also the spirit of free trade. According to the sculptor, "Expo is where business is done, the speech balloons show the kind of conversations and dialogues which people have, and the chairs show where business takes place." With the surrounding colours of the station reflected in the artwork's shiny surfaces, it transformed them into two sets of "magnificent kaleidoscopes" which also symbolises cultural exchange.

In popular culture
The station is featured in the tvN series Little Women.

References

External links
 
 Expo to Changi Airport MRT station route

Foster and Partners buildings
Lattice shell structures
Changi
Railway stations in Singapore opened in 2001
Mass Rapid Transit (Singapore) stations